Luquan Yi and Miao Autonomous County is an autonomous county, under the jurisdiction of Kunming, Yunnan, China, bordering Sichuan province to the north. As of the 2020 census the population was 378,881.

The county seat has two bus stations. The first is the long-distance Kunming-Luquan bus station, near the access to the G108 highway. The second is the local public bus station behind the Wuxinglu street market, with buses north to Maoshan, Tuanjie, Zhongping and Sayingpan, south to Songde, east to Cuihua and west to Wuding County.

Economy 
Luquan's agriculture is specialized in sericulture, chestnuts, white kidney beans, coffee, and  tobacco.

Administrative divisions

Ethnic groups
29.95% of the population in 2020 belonged to ethnic minorities, mainly Yi and Miao.

There are 1,026 ethnic Hani as of 1990, who live in  Xiaojing 硝井 and Liuhe 六合 of Chongde Township 崇德乡, and Xinglong 兴龙 and Chutu 初途 of Cuihua Township 翠华乡 (Luquan County Gazetteer 1995:150). The only Hani-speaking village is Liuhe 六合 of Chongde Township 崇德乡. Their autonym is Luomian 罗缅.

The Luquan County Gazetteer (1995:132) lists the following Yi subgroups.
Nasu 纳苏 (Black Yi 黑彝)
Aluo 阿罗 (Dry Yi 干彝 or White Yi 白彝)
Gaopo 稿颇 (Dry Yi 干彝 or White Yi 白彝)
Miqipo 密期颇 (Micha 密岔)
Sanipo 撒尼颇 (Milang 密朗)
Nuosu 诺苏 (Liangshan Yi 凉山彝)
Lipo 里颇

Climate

References 

 Area Code and Postal Code in Yunnan Province

External links 
Luquan County Official Website

County-level divisions of Kunming
Yi autonomous counties
Miao autonomous counties